James Horton III (born July 3, 1956) is a racecar driver currently racing a dirt modified for the Halmar Racing Team weekly at the Orange County Fair Speedway and other major events across the northeast. He raced in 48 NASCAR Winston Cup races in eight seasons. He was a regular on the ARCA circuit in the 1980s and 1990s. Horton has won many of the most noted races for dirt track modifieds in the Northeastern United States.

Racing career

Local racer
Horton first became known as a modified racecar driver in the Northeastern United States. He began racing in a small block powered sportsman car owned by his father, in the early 1970s. He won the sportsman championship at Orange County Speedway in 1974.

He has won a plethora of modified and sportsman championships at numerous tracks. He was the 1976 Modified champion at Orange County driving his dad's No. 43 and won it again in 2017 driving the Halmar Racing No. 43. That season, he was involved in one of the rare dead heat modified feature wins along with fellow future NASCAR racer Tighe Scott. It was the first race of a twin 50 feature and it was too close to call. Scott and Horton's cars collided after the race. After 1976 he started racing in the No. 3 Statewide dirt modified. He won track championships at Bridgeport Speedway (NJ) in 1975, 1977, 1980, 1982, 1983, 1997, 1998, 2003 and, 2014. Horton won the most races on Bridgeport's 5/8 mile track (before it was reconfigured as a 4/10 mile in 2020). He is a 2-time winner of the premier race in dirt modified racing, the Super DIRT Week 200 (1987 & 1994). He won the Eastern States 200 in his later career. He won modified track championships at New Egypt Speedway (NJ) in 2004 and 2006. He is still racing in weekly races at as of 2022.

NASCAR
Horton made his first NASCAR start in the Busch Grand National series in 1985. He raced in seven Busch races in his career.

Most of his career Winston Cup starts were at tracks in the Northeastern United States for underfunded teams, but Horton made two starts (and a relief driver appearance) at Hendrick Motorsports in 1990 when Darrell Waltrip was injured during final practice for the Firecracker 400.  Horton's two starts for Hendrick were in the two July restrictor plate races—Daytona and Talladega, and also participated as a relief driver at the second Pocono race.  Horton started 41st in the Firecracker (had to move to the rear of the field because of the driver change) at Daytona race, and finished 17th. He finished a career best 13th in the summer race at Talladega, the second of the two races in Hendrick's Tide #17 Chevrolet.  (Greg Sacks drove the car, except for Sarel van der Merwe at Watkins Glen, until Darlington, when Waltrip was cleared to return.)

Horton was involved in a major crash during the 69th lap of the 1993 DieHard 500. Horton's car was clipped by Stanley Smith's car. Horton's car hit three other cars before it flew over the wall and landed on an access road outside of the track. Smith suffered near-fatal head injuries in the incident, while Horton walked out of the wreck virtually unscathed.

ARCA
Horton won numerous ARCA races, including the series premiere event, the Daytona ARCA 200, in 1990 and 1992. The 1992 victory was his seventh superspeedway victory, which at the time was the second most in series history. He used a NASCAR Chevrolet Lumina purchased from Darrell Waltrip for the victory.  Horton escaped serious injury after a frightening crash at Atlanta in 1995.  Horton's #52 AC Delco Chevrolet rolled over during a multi-car accident.  His car was struck from the bottom while rolling by teammate Ed Dixon.  Incredibly, neither driver was seriously injured.

Personal life
His son Jimmy Horton IV (born March 2, 1987) raced Modifieds for his Grandfather at New Egypt Speedway (NJ) and Bridgeport Speedway (NJ).

Motorsports career results

NASCAR
(key) (Bold – Pole position awarded by qualifying time. Italics – Pole position earned by points standings or practice time. * – Most laps led.)

Winston Cup Series

Daytona 500

Busch Series

ARCA Hooters SuperCar Series
(key) (Bold – Pole position awarded by qualifying time. Italics – Pole position earned by points standings or practice time. * – Most laps led.)

References

External links

1956 births
ARCA Menards Series drivers
Living people
NASCAR drivers
People from Folsom, New Jersey
Sportspeople from Trenton, New Jersey
Sportspeople from Atlantic County, New Jersey
Racing drivers from New Jersey
USAC Silver Crown Series drivers
World of Outlaws drivers
Hendrick Motorsports drivers